Peter Marchbank, is a British conductor.

Biography 

Peter Marchbank studied Music at Cambridge University, was briefly the Music Master at Queen Mary's School for Boys, Basingstoke and then joined the BBC in 1969.  In 1977, he was appointed Senior Producer of the BBC Philharmonic Orchestra. In 1991 he joined the Orchestre National de Lille.

In Britain, Peter Marchbank has conducted  the Northern Sinfonia and the Orchestra of the Swan. Overseas, he has conducted major orchestras in Australia, Bulgaria, Colombia, Costa Rica, the Czech Republic, Ecuador, Egypt, France, Germany, Lithuania, Norway, Panama, Poland, Portugal, Romania, South Africa, Sweden, Turkey, Ukraine and Venezuela .

References 

English conductors (music)
British male conductors (music)
Living people
Year of birth missing (living people)
Place of birth missing (living people)
Alumni of the University of Cambridge
21st-century British conductors (music)
21st-century British male musicians